The unicameral National Assembly (Portuguese: Assembleia Nacional) is the legislative body of the Republic of Cabo Verde.

History

National People's Assembly (1975–1991)

The country's first legislative election took place in June 1975. The body was known as the National People's Assembly and its members came from the African Party for the Independence of Guinea and Cape Verde (PAIGC), which was the sole political party allowed to field candidates. They elected PAIGC Secretary-general Aristides Pereira President on 5 July 1975, when the country officially gained independence from Portugal.

One-party elections were again held on 7 December 1980 with Pereira being re-elected unopposed by the Assembly on 12 February 1981. That same year the Cape Verdean branch of the PAIGC, which was also the ruling party in Guinea-Bissau, was renamed African Party for the Independence of Cape Verde (PAICV).

Elections for an enlarged 83-seat National People's Assembly took place on 7 December 1985. For the first time a few independent, PAICV-endorsed candidates won seats in the legislature.

In 1990, Cape Verde became one of the first African countries to abandon one-party rule and embrace multiparty democracy.

National Assembly (1991–2016)
The first multiparty National Assembly elections took place on 13 January 1991. The ruling PAICV was soundly defeated by the opposition Movement for Democracy (MPD), which won 56 out of 79 seats compared to the PAICV's 23. The elections were considered transparent, free, and fair.

In the next election, held on 17 December 1995, the number of Assembly seats was reduced from 79 to 72. The MPD won 50 seats and the PAICV won 21. The Democratic Convergence Party (PCD) won the remaining seat.

After the elections on 14 January 2001, the Assembly has a total of 72 directly elected members who serve five-year terms. They are elected from 16 multi-member constituencies using the D'Hondt method of party-list proportional representation.

Four parties and one coalition contested the election of 2001. They were the PAICV, MPD, Democratic Renewal Party (PRD), and the Social Democratic Party (PSD). Three parties - the Democratic Convergence Party (PCD), Democratic and Independent Cape Verdean Union (UCID), and the Labour and Solidarity Party (PTS) - formed a coalition known as the Democratic Alliance for Change (ADM). The election results are as follows:

PAICV - 49.50% of the vote and 40 seats
MPD - 40.55% of the vote and 30 seats
ADM - 6.12% of the vote and 2 seats
PRD - 3.38% of the vote and no seats
PSD - 0.45% of the vote and no seats

Eight women won seats in the National Assembly.

National Assembly (2016-present)
Following the parliamentary election in March 2016, the Movement for Democracy party won a majority of the seats in the election. This was the first time the ruling party PAICV have lost their majority in the parliament. Following the election Ulisses Correia e Silva became Prime Minister and Jorge Pedro Maurício dos Santos was elected President of the National Assembly. Following this defeat, the former ruling party the PAICV lost morale and lost in the local and presidential elections in the same year.

Presidents of the National Assembly

Constituencies
Cape Verde has thirteen constituencies for the National Assembly, of which 10 are in Cape Verde and the other three are abroad.

See also
History of Cape Verde
Legislative Branch

References

External links
Official site 

Politics of Cape Verde
Political organizations based in Cape Verde
Government of Cape Verde
Cape Verde
Cape Verde
1975 establishments in Cape Verde